The men's 50 metre team pistol (originally called team competition with revolver and pistol) was a shooting sports event held as part of the shooting at the 1912 Summer Olympics programme. It was the third appearance of the event, which had also been held in 1900 and 1908. The competition was held on Tuesday, 2 July 1912. Twenty sport shooters from five nations competed. The event was won by the United States, successfully defending its Olympic title. The American team included John Dietz, a veteran of the 1908 Games, making him the first to win multiple medals in the event. Silver went to Sweden. Great Britain repeated as bronze medalists.

Background

This was the third appearance of a team version of what would become (for individuals) standardised as the men's ISSF 50 meter pistol event. The team event was held 4 times, at every Summer Olympics from 1900 to 1920 (except 1904, when no shooting events were held).

The Russian Empire made its debut in the event. The other four nations were all making their second appearance; each had competed in 1908 but not 1900.

Competition format

The competition had each shooter fire 60 shots, in 10 series of 6 shots each, at a distance of 50 metres. The time allowed for each series was 4 minutes. The target was round, 50 centimetres in diameter, with 10 scoring rings. Scoring for each shot was up to 10 points, in increments of 1 point. The maximum score possible was 600 points. Ties were broken by countback (10s, 9s, 8s, etc.). Any revolver or pistol could be used; only open sights were allowed. Any ammunition with a metal cartridge case could be used. Pistols with hairspring triggers, allowed in the world championship, were banned. The individual and team events were separate, with scores not carrying over.

Schedule

Results

References

External links
 
 

Shooting at the 1912 Summer Olympics